The 1961 Wimbledon Championships took place on the outdoor grass courts at the All England Lawn Tennis and Croquet Club in Wimbledon, London, United Kingdom. The tournament ran from 26 June until 8 July. It was the 75th staging of the Wimbledon Championships, and the third Grand Slam tennis event of 1961.

Champions

Seniors

Men's singles

 Rod Laver defeated  Chuck McKinley, 6–3, 6–1, 6–4

Women's singles

 Angela Mortimer defeated  Christine Truman, 4–6, 6–4, 7–5

Men's doubles

 Roy Emerson /  Neale Fraser defeated  Bob Hewitt /  Fred Stolle, 6–4, 6–8, 6–4, 6–8, 8–6

Women's doubles

 Karen Hantze /  Billie Jean Moffitt defeated  Jan Lehane /  Margaret Smith, 6–3, 6–4

Mixed doubles

 Fred Stolle /  Lesley Turner defeated  Robert Howe /  Edda Buding, 11–9, 6–2

Juniors

Boys' singles

 Clark Graebner defeated  Ernst Blanke, 6–3, 9–7

Girls' singles

 Galina Baksheeva defeated  Katherine Chabot, 6–4, 8–6

References

External links
 Official Wimbledon Championships website

 
Wimbledon Championships
Wimbledon Championships
Wimbledon Championships
Wimbledon Championships